Eupithecia submiranda is a moth in the family Geometridae. It is found in Suriname.

The wingspan is about 18 mm. The forewings are dingy olive-ochreous. The markings are dull dark grey. The hindwings are similar, but the grey markings are much duller.

References

Moths described in 1906
submiranda
Moths of South America